The 2019 Almaty Challenger was a professional tennis tournament played on hard courts. It was the fourth edition of the tournament which was part of the 2019 ATP Challenger Tour. It took place in Almaty, Kazakhstan between 3 and 9 June 2019.

Singles main draw entrants

Seeds

 1 Rankings are as of 27 May 2019.

Other entrants
The following players received entry into the singles main draw as wildcards:
  Andrey Golubev
  Sebastian Korda
  Alexandar Lazarov
  Timofei Skatov
  Khumoyun Sultanov

The following player received entry into the singles main draw as an alternate:
  Wu Di

The following players received entry into the singles main draw using their ITF World Tennis Rankings:
  Riccardo Bonadio
  Konstantin Kravchuk
  Skander Mansouri
  Alejandro Tabilo
  Alexander Zhurbin

The following players received entry from the qualifying draw:
  Ivan Gakhov
  Vladyslav Manafov

Champions

Singles

 Lorenzo Giustino def.  Federico Coria 6–4, 6–4.

Doubles

References

Almaty Challenger
2019 in Kazakhstani sport
June 2019 sports events in Kazakhstan